Bus rapid transit creep is a phenomenon commonly defined as a bus rapid transit (BRT) system that fails to meet the requirements to be considered "true BRT". These systems are often marketed as a fully realized bus rapid transit system, but end up being described as more of an improvement to regular bus service by proponents of the "BRT creep" term. Notably, the ITDP published several guidelines in an attempt to define what constitutes the term of "true BRT", known as the BRT Standard, in an attempt to avert this phenomenon.

Proponents of the "Bus Rapid Transit" term cite it as a form of mass transit that uses buses in a dedicated right-of-way, ideally providing speed and volume of service similar to light rail. A commonly cited advantage of BRT is the lack of need to build new rail infrastructure, as new rail has greater initial capital costs than using existing roads and cannot be changed easily. 

The flexibility of BRT, with its greater similarity to other forms of bus transportation, also means that there are fewer obstacles to removing expensive or difficult-to-implement features such as dedicated lanes. On the downside, however, this flexibility can lead to service enhancements being whittled away in a manner that is not possible once rail solutions have been built. (Transit agencies have incentive to strip down service after a BRT route is initially presented, partially because BRT might have up to 24% higher operating costs than rail solutions of a similar size according to a parametric cost model, if traffic signal priority is not effective. On the other hand “For trunk line capacities below about 1,600 spaces per hour, the headway-versus-cost trade-off favors BRT”.)
This type of stripping down service is known as BRT creep.

Description
The most extreme versions of BRT creep lead to systems that cannot even truly be recognized as "Bus Rapid Transit". For example, a rating from the Institute for Transportation and Development Policy (ITDP) determined that the Boston Silver Line was best classified as "Not BRT" after local decision makers gradually decided to do away with most BRT-specific features. The study also evaluates New York City's Select Bus Service (which is supposed to be BRT-standard) as "Not BRT".

Worried about similar circumstances, Virginia writer Kevin Beekman urges residents in areas planned for BRT development to use the ITDP scoring worksheet (BRT Standard) as an assessment tool. Another Washington-area writer, Dan Reed, furthers this sentiment, writing that if BRT creep is allowed to reach its full conclusion, it's "bad for commuters, but it's also bad for taxpayers who were sold a high-end service only to find out that we just painted the buses a different color".

According to Dan Malouff, a transit planner who was one of the earliest people to use the phrase, the slippery slope towards BRT creep varies widely from system to system. He says in a piece republished by The Washington Post that "there are a thousand corners like that you can cut that individually may or may not hurt too much, but collectively add up to the difference between BRT and a regular bus".  Major compromises in service are highlighted by one or more common symptoms: buses run in shared general purpose lanes or HOV lanes rather than dedicated lanes, using traditional bus stops instead of full-featured stations, eliminating fare pre-payment and all-door boarding which slows passenger boarding, and offering no priority at traffic lights.

Detroit writer Michael Jackman mentions the removal of "signal pre-emption, dedicated lanes separated by concrete berms, heated, ADA-compliant stations, preticketing, and more" as indicators of BRT creep.

Counterarguments, remediation, and alternative labels
Author and activist Matthew Yglesias has argued in Slate Magazine that BRT creep is a very real worry, but that the issue is not "a problem with buses, it's a problem with cheapskates".

Houston Tomorrow points out some ways local legislation can prevent BRT creep: "The new section on Bus Rapid Transit specifically defines it as having a separated right-of-way (at least for the majority of the line and during peak periods), defined stations, short headways and signal priority."

One drawback to the phrase is that it uses "creep" in a way that is contradictory to other terms such as "scope creep", "feature creep", and "mission creep". "BRT creep" refers to how features can be eaten away due to lack of funding or political will, while the other terms typically refer to an expanding scope.

Additional examples
 In Seattle, plans for BRT lines were scaled back to allow "mixed traffic" operation on large portions of the lines
In San Jose, the Alum Rock-Santa Clara BRT line includes only one mile of dedicated bus lanes along the seven-mile route, while plans for a second BRT route along El Camino saw the proposed dedicated bus lanes dropped before the project itself was eventually cancelled.
 In Portland, dedicated lanes were scrapped early in the planning process, while the BRT label was kept. 
 In Delhi, dedicated lanes got built, only to be rolled back by a pair of judges who did not understand why cars should not drive in them. That decision was eventually reversed, after considerable damage to the BRT line's reputation for speed.
 In Curitiba, Brazil, Rede Integrada de Transporte has failed to integrate its growing suburbs into a coherent regional plan.
 In New York City and East Lansing, plans for physically separated lanes were discarded in favor of difficult-to-enforce painted curbside lanes.
 In Cleveland, the HealthLine—often cited as a BRT success story—BRT creep nonetheless occurred when traffic signal priority was turned off, after complaints from drivers.
 In Boston, the Silver Line is branded as BRT but lacks most BRT-quality features such as enforced exclusive bus lanes, high level platforms, or off-vehicle fare collection. Notably, Route SL1 operates in mixed traffic along a routing that has been widely criticized as inefficient and unnecessarily convoluted, and includes a mixed-traffic freeway segment that often experiences severe congestion.
 In the Denver-Boulder area of Colorado, the "Flatiron Flyer," which was originally pitched as a BRT service, gradually did away with advance ticketing, signal priority and most dedicated lanes.
 In Fresno, California, administrators eliminated exclusive bus lanes, level boarding, stations and short headways, while continuing to use "BRT" as a descriptor for what eventually amounted to a normal bus line with two-door boarding.
 In Las Vegas, the Regional Transportation Commission of Southern Nevada's four lines branded as BRT lack many key modal features. The SDX (Strip-Downtown Express), Boulder Highway Express (BHX), and Sahara Express (SX) routes operate in dedicated lines only along portions of their route, have simplified "stops" instead of stations, and no longer use specifically branded vehicles. A fifth line, the MAX line along Las Vegas Blvd North and branded as an early BRT system, was later converted to a higher frequency local route. 
 In San Francisco, the Van Ness Bus Rapid Transit project omits raised platforms for level boarding; station platforms will be built at standard sidewalk height instead.
 In Buenos Aires, Argentina, the Metrobus lacks of pre-pay feature to reduce delays on passengers boarding, the buses don't get any priority at intersections neither extended green phase or reduced the red phase. Platform-level is not different from regular sidewalks.
 In the Minneapolis/St. Paul region there are two routes marketed as BRT, but do not actually achieve the standards of BRT. The first is the METRO Red Line, which opened in 2013 between Apple Valley, Minnesota and Mall of America in the southern suburban region of Minneapolis. Headways are every 20 minutes, there is no off-board fare payment, and buses do not have a dedicated right-of-way (there are shoulder lanes that buses may use during traffic backups). The other route is the A Line (Minnesota), which opened in 2016 between South Minneapolis and Roseville, Minnesota. The A Line is locally referred to as arterial BRT (ABRT). While the entire route has no dedicated right-of-way, headways are every 10 minutes and there is off-board fare payment.
 In Guangzhou, China, authorities decided to open GBRT lanes to mixed traffic during peak hours; as a result, the BRT system's average peak hour speeds dropped to 16 km/h from their previous average of 20 km/h.
In Manila, the EDSA busway has no off board fare collection, high platforms and most of the buses do not have doors on the same side as the platform.
In Auckland, New Zealand, the dedicated Northern Busway only runs between Constellation and Akoranga bus stations; services north to Albany & Hibiscus Coast, and south to the Auckland CBD, are forced to operate in mixed traffic. Northern Busway services also still use on-board fare collection (albeit with the contactless AT HOP card).
In Memphis, Tennessee, mConnect is branded as BRT despite being planned to have dedicated bus lanes along B.B. King Blvd. and Second St, less than 10% of the total planned route.
In Austin, Texas, two routes marketed as BRT were introduced under the MetroRapid banner in 2014. Outside of a short stretch of transit-priority lanes shared by other local and commuter routes through Downtown, both the 801 and 803 operate in mixed traffic. Subsequent MetroRapid investments were included in Capital Metro's Project Connect high-capacity transit plan as "Bus Rapid Transit Light" but which are now referred to in official documents simply as MetroRapid.

See also
 Guided busway

References

Bus rapid transit